The Uy is a river in Novosibirsk and Omsk Oblasts in Russia. The Uy is a right tributary of the Irtysh. The climate in its basin is mainly snowy, and there is flooding from April to June.

Tributaries
Krapivka (26 km), Kargachi (35 km), Boborovka (55 km), Shchelkanovka (58 km), Bobrovka (68 km), Medvedevka (71 km), Yermakovka (80 km), Kitap (99 km), Unarka (104 km), Intsiss (123 km), Urmanka (134 km), Bolgun (144 km), Uchug (149 km), Shaitanka (158 km), Tereul (197 km), Kainsass (207 km), Stanovaya (217 km), Tuzovka (217 km), Maly Kainsass (230 km), Kainsass (236 km), Keizess (243 km), Shaitanka (256 km), Kalantsass (271 km), Prygan (285 km), Tunguzka (287 km), Iksashka (299 km), Kuitra (309 km), Taitas (324 km), Salym (356 km), Razvily (360 km).

References

Rivers of Novosibirsk Oblast
Rivers of Omsk Oblast